The Hive is a 2014 American science fiction horror film co-written and directed by David Yarovesky. The film was released in a limited release on September 14, 2015, by Nerdist Industries.

Plot
Infected with an unknown virus that mutated his body, Adam Goldstein wakes in a barricaded cabin with no immediate recollection of who he is or what has happened. Through a series of intermittent flashbacks, messages he wrote to himself, and clues such as sketches and photographs, Adam gradually pieces together the recent past.

Flashbacks to the 1980s show Russian scientist Dr. Yuri Yegorov performing experiments on restrained subjects in an attempt to connect their brains to a hive mind consciousness. The experiments succeed, but patients mutate, break free from their restraints, and cause chaos as they kill researchers in the lab.  More recent flashbacks show Dr. Baker performing brain surgery on a little girl named Kayla who inexplicably recites a complex mathematical equation before dying during the operation.  Based on what he saw with Kayla, Dr. Baker seeks funding for research into shared memories.  A mysterious man in a suit sets up Dr. Baker in a lab with Dr. Yegorov’s research as a starting point.  Dr. Yegorov eventually comes to warn Dr. Baker that their research is dangerous and potentially evil.  When Baker refuses to back down, Yegorov holds Baker at gunpoint while his men steal the hive virus samples used on test subjects. Yegorov’s team escapes with the materials on a hijacked plane.

Adam remembers being a counselor at Camp Yellow Jacket with his friend Clark. Even though Adam has a history of sleeping around with women at the camp, including a secret affair with Clark’s girlfriend Jess, Adam falls for a counselor named Katie and the two of them gradually foster a romance.

Yegorov’s plane crashes in a nearby forest. Adam, Clark, Katie, and Jess investigate the crash site only to be attacked by a pilot infected with the hive virus. Clark crashes their vehicle when the quartet tries to escape. Everyone makes it back to camp on foot, but not before the pilot vomits a black substance that infects Jess.

Adam and Katie leave Clark with Jess in the infirmary while they go to radio for help. Adam then leaves Katie alone in a vehicle while he goes on ahead to discover all the camp kids infected.  Through hive mind voices, Jess reveals to Clark her affair with Adam.  Clark exits the infirmary to hunt down Adam but Clark finds Katie and ends up infecting her.

Infected Katie returns to the infirmary and tells Adam he should escape.   Jess attacks Adam and he is forced to kill her to save himself.  Adam locks Katie in a separate room to protect her but she infects him with the black substance before he locks the door.  Adam leaves messages and clues for himself to explain the situation for the time when the infection inevitably possesses him.  He then succumbs to the virus and collapses. Adam preemptively uses his affection for Katie as a thought trigger to revive himself.  He allows Clark into the cabin but is taunted by the hive mind voices and he needs to beat Clark to death.

Although successfully disconnected from the hive mind, Adam realizes he can still tap into virtually anyone’s memory.  Adam frees Katie from the other room and tries to disconnect her from the hive. Katie remains possessed and Adam is forced to kill her.  He then uses a soldier's memory and a defibrillator to restart Katie’s heart.  Katie returns to life with regained control over her own sentience.

Adam and Katie flee the cabin, battle several people possessed by the hive, and eventually escape in a vehicle. However, Adam’s narration intimates that the world was overrun by the infection and he planted false memories about their escape in Katie’s mind to protect her from the truth.

Cast

Release
The film had its world premiere on September 19, 2014 at Fantastic Fest in Austin, Texas. It was presented at the 2015 San Diego Comic-Con International in July 2015, and was subsequently released to theaters and digital platforms by Nerdist Industries in Fall 2015. The film was released in a limited release on September 14, 2015, for one-night-only partnership with Fathom Events.

References

External links
 

2014 films
2014 horror films
American horror thriller films
American science fiction horror films
American nonlinear narrative films
American zombie films
Films about amnesia
Films about viral outbreaks
Films set in the 1980s
Films set in 2014
Films set in forests
2010s science fiction horror films
2014 horror thriller films
Legendary Pictures films
2010s English-language films
Films directed by David Yarovesky
2010s American films